The Men's 200 Individual Medley (or I.M.) event at the 2005 FINA World Aquatics Championships was swum 27 – 28 July 2005 in Montreal, Quebec, Canada. Preliminary and Semifinal heats were 27 July; the Final 28 July. The top-16 swimmers from the Prelims in the morning advanced to the 1 of 2 Seminfinal in the evening; the top-8 swimmers from the Semifinals then advanced to the Final the next evening.

As the Swimming portion of the World Championships are swum in a long course (50m) pool, this race consisted of 4 lengths. As it was an IM event, each length was a different stroke, swum in the order of: butterfly, backstroke, breaststroke and then freestyle.

At the start of the event, the existing World (WR) and Championships (CR) records were:
 WR: 1:55.94, Michael Phelps (USA), swum 9 August 2003 in College Park, USA;
 CR: 1:56.04, Michael Phelps (USA), swum 25 July 2003 in Barcelona, Spain.

No new world or competition records were set during this competition.

Results

Final

Semifinals

Preliminary heats

References
Worlds 2005 results: Men's 200m Individual Medley Prelims, from OmegaTiming.com (official timer of the 2005 Worlds); Retrieved 2010-01-24.
Worlds 2005 results: Men's 200m Individual Medley Semifinals, from OmegaTiming.com (official timer of the 2005 Worlds); Retrieved 2010-01-24.
Worlds 2005 results: Men's 200m Individual Medley Finals, from OmegaTiming.com (official timer of the 2005 Worlds); Retrieved 2010-01-24.

Swimming at the 2005 World Aquatics Championships